Meanderings of Memory is a rare book published in London in 1852 and attributed to Nightlark (probably a pseudonym).  Although it is cited as a first or early source for over 50 entries in the Oxford English Dictionary (OED), the current OED editors have been unable to locate a surviving copy.  OED editors made their search for the elusive source public in May 2013.

OED citations

The OED is a comprehensive multi-volume historical dictionary, whose first edition was published in installments called fascicles between 1884 and 1928. The definition of every sense of every headword entry is accompanied by quotations, listed chronologically, from cited sources, to illustrate when and how the word was used.
  These citations were mostly submitted to the editors by volunteer readers in what current OED editors describe as an early instance of what is now called crowdsourcing. The editors selected a subset of quotations, including the earliest one for a given sense, for inclusion. They typically verified the citations given, though some might be taken on trust based on the submitter's reputation or previous reliability.

The first edition of the OED included citations from Meanderings of Memory for senses of 50 entries: chapelled, cock-a-bondy, couchward, day, dike/dyke, droop, dump, epistle, extemporize, fancy, flambeau, flesh, foodless, fringy, full, gigantomachy, goal, goalward, hearthward, idol, inscriptionless, lump, peaceless, rape, re- (prefix), reliefless, rheumatize, sanctuaried, sap, sarcophage, scarf, scavage, shoe, slippery, sun, templed, transplanter, tribe, tribunal, trouse, trunked, un- (prefix), unbusy, unstuff, vermined, vulgar, warmthless, wen, whinge, and width. In 2010, the third edition of the OED added the word revirginize, whose earliest citation is the 51st from Meanderings of Memory. Inspection of the original submission slips in the OED archive in 2013 revealed that they came from Edward Peacock (1831–1915), an antiquary, writer, and regular OED volunteer reader living near Brigg in Lincolnshire.

OED revision
The second (1989) edition of the OED retained almost all the information of the first edition essentially unrevised. The third edition (publication ongoing since 2000) is fully revisiting all entries.  A staff member revising the entry for revirginize in 2013 sought to verify the word's earliest citation, from Meanderings of Memory: "Where that cosmetic ... Shall e'er revirginize that brow's abuse". When the staffer failed to locate the work, OED chief bibliographer Veronica Hurst launched a deeper search. No copy could be located; Hurst found no mention in Google Books, the Oxford Dictionary of National Biography or other works consulted; and confirmation of the book's existence initially rested entirely upon a short listing in an 1854 catalogue of G. Gancia, a bookseller in Brighton:  

Investigating the Latin epigraph was another dead end. It translates to "why did my tears please you more, my Philomel?" and does not appear to be a quotation from another work.

Public appeal
On 3 May 2013, OED editors posted about the book on the "OED Appeals" section of the website, which continues the volunteer-reader tradition by asking the public for help with the history of particular words or other lexicographic issues. The original post was:

The appeal was reported in the general media.

Ongoing search
Seven Gancia catalogues are bound in a volume once owned by an A. F. Rodger, now in the Oxford University library and on Google Books. Three of these list Meanderings of Memory, with variations in detail and price: the Third Catalogue for 1852 on page 20;  the First Catalogue for 1854 on page 10;  and the Second Catalogue for 1854 (referred to by the OED) on page 27. The John Rylands Library, which contains many of Edward Peacock's private papers, found no copy of Meanderings of Memory.

Hurst suggested the book might contain content considered pornographic by Victorians, potentially resulting in nonstandard cataloguing. It might have been self- or privately published with a very small print run. Following the appeal to the public, another reference to Meanderings of Memory was found in an 1854 Sotheby's catalogue, which rendered less likely the notion that the work might be a hoax by a nineteenth-century miscreant. Identification of Peacock as the reader corroborated this. Given the "flowery" character of the work's quotations appearing in the OED, and in light of the Sotheby's auction record, Hurst postulates that Meanderings of Memory may turn out to be a short book of poetry.

Notes

References

OED (1st edition)

Other
  
 Google Books scan (HTML)
 Bodleian Library scan (PDF 96.6 MB)

Citations

External links

OED Appeals: Meanderings of Memory, unknown source

1852 non-fiction books
Lexicography
Crowdsourcing
Lost books
Works of unknown authorship
Oxford English Dictionary